A Snoopy cap, or communication cap, is a part of a space suit worn by American astronauts on the head and incorporating an audio headset for communication.
The cap is nicknamed after the Peanuts character, whom its black and white paneling resembled.
Its NASA designation is Communications Carrier Assembly. The "Snoopy cap" includes two earphones and two microphones, to tolerate failure of a single unit.

References

Space suit components
Headgear
Peanuts (comic strip)